Sashka is a 1981 Soviet war film directed by Aleksandr Surin.

Plot 
The film takes place in 1942 near Rzhev, where military operations take place. The film tells about the village couple Sashka, who leads an unequal battle with the enemy.

Cast 
 Andrey Tashkov as Sashka
 Marina Yakovleva as Zina
 Vladimir Simonov as Lieutenant Volodka
 Yuri Veyalis as Zhora
 Leonid Yarmolnik as Kurt
 Yuri Grebenshchikov as Battalion Commander
 Vyacheslav Molokov as Orderly Tolik
 Mikhail Shuleykin as Company Commander (as Mikhail Krylov)
 Elena Antonenko as Lyuba
 Nartay Begalin

References

External links 
 

1981 films
1980s Russian-language films
Soviet war films
Soviet World War II films
Russian World War II films